Birbhum Vivekananda Homoeopathic Medical College & Hospital is a homoeopathic medical college and hospital in Sainthia, Birbhum District, West Bengal, India. It was established in 1972 by Ashok Kumar Bose. It offers the Bachelor of Homeopathic Medicine and Surgery (BHMS) courses. It is recognized by the Central Council of Homoeopathy (CCH), Ministry of Ayush and affiliated with the West Bengal University of Health Sciences.

References

External links

Homoeopathic Medical Colleges in West Bengal
Homeopathic hospitals
Hospitals in West Bengal
Hospitals established in 1972
1972 establishments in West Bengal